Charlotte Louise Voll (born 22 April 1999) is a German professional footballer who plays as a goalkeeper for Austrian ÖFB-Frauenliga side SCR Altach/FFC Vorderland.

Club career
A youth academy graduate of TSG Hoffenheim, Voll made her debut for their reserve side in 2. Frauen-Bundesliga on 31 October 2015. Even though she didn't play any match for the senior side, she appeared in six more matches for the reserve side before leaving the club in 2017.

On 19 July 2017, French Division 1 Féminine club Paris Saint-Germain announced the signing of Voll on a two-year deal. With Katarzyna Kiedrzynek and Christiane Endler ahead of her in pecking order of senior team, she spent most of her time with club's youth side in Challenge National Féminin U19. Upon the expiration of contract in May 2019, she left the club without playing any official matches for senior team.

On 21 May 2019, Frauen-Bundesliga club SC Sand announced the signing of Voll on a two-year deal. She made her professional debut on 13 October 2019, keeping a clean sheet in 3–0 league win against FFC Frankfurt.

International career
Voll is a former German youth international and was part of the national team which reached quarter-final of 2018 FIFA U-20 Women's World Cup.

Honours

Club 
Paris Saint-Germain
 Division 1 Féminine: 2020–21
 Coupe de France féminine: 2021–22

References

External links
 

1999 births
Living people
Footballers from Karlsruhe
German women's footballers
Women's association football goalkeepers
TSG 1899 Hoffenheim (women) players
Paris Saint-Germain Féminine players
SC Sand players
2. Frauen-Bundesliga players
Frauen-Bundesliga players
German expatriate women's footballers
German expatriate sportspeople in France
Expatriate women's footballers in France
Expatriate women's footballers in Austria